Guido Castelnuovo (14 August 1865 – 27 April 1952) was an Italian mathematician. He is best known for his contributions to the field of algebraic geometry, though his contributions to the study of statistics and probability theory are also significant.

Life

Early life 

Castelnuovo was born in Venice. His father, Enrico Castelnuovo, was a novelist and campaigner for the unification of Italy. His mother Emma Levi was a relative of Cesare Lombroso and David Levi. His wife Elbina Marianna Enriques was the sister of mathematician Federigo Enriques and zoologist Paolo Enriques.

At the University of Padua he was taught by Giuseppe Veronese. He also achieved minor fame due to winning the university salsa dancing competition. After his graduation, he sent one of his papers to Corrado Segre, whose replies he found remarkably helpful. It marked the beginning of a long period of collaboration.

Career 
Castelnuovo spent one year in Rome to research advanced geometry. After that he was appointed as an assistant of Enrico D'Ovidio at the University of Turin, where he was strongly influenced by Corrado Segre. Here he worked with Alexander von Brill and Max Noether. In 1891 he moved back to Rome to work at the chair of Analytic and Projective Geometry. Here he was a colleague of Luigi Cremona, his former teacher, and took over his job when the later died in 1903. He also founded the University of Rome's School of Statistics and Actuarial Sciences (1927). He influenced a younger generation of Italian mathematicians and statisticians, including Corrado Gini and Francesco Paolo Cantelli.

Retirement and World War II 
Castelnuovo retired from teaching in 1935. It was a period of great political difficulty in Italy. In 1922 Benito Mussolini had risen to power and in 1938 a large number of anti-semitic laws were declared, which excluded him, like all other Jews, from public work. With the rise of Nazism, he was forced into hiding. However, during World War II, he organised and taught secret courses for Jewish students — the latter were not allowed to attend university either.

Final years and death 
After the liberation of Rome, Castelnuovo was appointed as a special commissioner of the Consiglio Nazionale delle Ricerche in June 1944. He was given the task to repair the damage done to Italian scientific institutions by the twenty years of Mussolini's rule. He became president of the Accademia dei Lincei until his death and was elected a member of the Académie des Sciences in Paris. On 5 December 1949, he became a life senator of the Italian Republic.

Castelnuovo died at the age of 86 on 27 April 1952 in Rome. He is buried in the Verano cemetery, in Rome, together with his wife, Elbina Enriques Castelnuovo and his mathematician daughter, Emma Castelnuovo.

Work 
In Turin Castelnuovo was strongly influenced by Corrado Segre. In this period he published high-quality work on algebraic curves. He also made a major step in reinterpreting the work on linear series by Alexander von Brill and Max Noether (Brill–Noether theory).

Castelnuovo had his own theory about how Mathematics should be taught. His courses were divided into two: first a general overview of mathematics, and then an in-depth theory of algebraic curves. He has said about this approach:

He also taught courses on algebraic functions and abelian integrals. Here, he treated, among other things, Riemann surfaces, non-Euclidean geometry, differential geometry, interpolation and approximation, and probability theory. He found the latter the most interesting, because as a relatively recent one, the relationship between the deduction and the empirical contribution was more clear. In 1919, he published Calcolo della probabilità e applicazioni, an early textbook on the subject. He also wrote a book on calculus, Le origini del calcolo infinitesimale nell'era moderna.

Castelnuovo's most important work was done in the field of algebraic geometry. In the early 1890s he published three famous papers, including one with the first use of the characteristic linear series of a family of curves. The Castelnuovo–Severi inequality was co-named after him. He collaborated with Federigo Enriques on the theory of surfaces. This collaboration started in 1892 when Enriques was only a student, but grew further over the next 20 years: they submitted their work to the Royal Prize in Mathematics by the Accademia dei Lincei in 1902, but were not given the prize because they had sent it jointly instead of under one name. Both received the prize in later years.

Another theorem named partly after Castelnuovo is the Kronecker–Castelnuovo theorem (1894): If the sections of an irreducible algebraic surface, having at most isolated singular points, with a general tangent plane turn out to be reducible curves, then the surface is either ruled surface and in fact a scroll, or the Veronese surface.  Kronecker never published it but stated it in a lecture. Castelnuovo proved it. In total, Castelnuovo published over 100 articles, books and memoirs.

See also

Castelnuovo curve
Castelnuovo–Mumford regularity
Castelnuovo theorem
Castelnuovo surface
Castelnuovo–de Franchis theorem
Castelnuovo–Richmond–Igusa quartic
Noether–Castelnouvo theorem
Homogeneous coordinate ring
Riemann–Roch theorem for surfaces
Italian school of algebraic geometry

References 
 
 17 references for further reading Some in English, most in Italian.
 
 

1865 births
1952 deaths
20th-century Italian mathematicians
19th-century Italian mathematicians
Algebraic geometers
Italian algebraic geometers
Italian people of World War II
19th-century Italian Jews
Scientists from Venice
Italian life senators
Italian statisticians
20th-century Italian politicians
Jewish Italian politicians
20th-century Italian Jews
National Research Council (Italy) people
University of Padua alumni